The 1991–92 Irish League Cup (known as the Wilkinson Sword League Cup for sponsorship reasons) was the sixth edition of Northern Ireland's secondary football knock-out cup competition. It concluded on 14 April 1992 with the final.

Glentoran were the defending champions. The previous season they had become the first club to win the trophy more than once, after the first four competitions were won by four clubs. They defeated Ards 2–0 in the previous final. This season however, they went out in the first round to Harland & Wolff Welders. The eventual winners were Linfield who won their second League Cup, defeating Larne 3–0 in the final.

First round

|}

Second round

|}

Quarter-finals

|}

Semi-finals

|}

Final

References

Lea
1991–92 domestic association football cups
1991–92